Mann's Best Friends is a British television sitcom which first aired on Channel 4 in 1985 It is set in a boarding house where the easy-going landlord fails to control the antics of his chaotic tenants, leading him to seek the assistance of the domineering Hamish James Ordway who has recently retired from the Water Board.

Main cast
 Fulton Mackay as Hamish James Ordway
 Barry Stanton as Henry Mann
 Bernard Bresslaw as  Duncan
 Barbara Hicks as  Mrs. Mann
 Patricia Brake as  Dolly Delights
 Clive Merrison as  Irvin
 Liz Smith as  Mrs. Anstruther
 Sara Corper as Phoebe
 Reginald Marsh as  Mr. Beasley (1 episode)
 Rebecca Lacey as Receptionist (1 episode)

References

Bibliography
 Maxford, Howard. Hammer Complete: The Films, the Personnel, the Company. McFarland, 2018.

External links
 

1985 British television series debuts
1985 British television series endings
1980s British comedy television series
Channel 4 sitcoms
English-language television shows